Katelyn Good (born November 8, 1990) is a Canadian former ice dancer who competed internationally for Denmark with Nikolaj Sørensen, winning the 2010 Danish national championship.  

Good and Sørensen trained in the United States with Mathew Gates.  In 2010, the duo moved to Montreal to train with Marie-France Dubreuil and Patrice Lauzon, in order to live in the same city as Good's mother.  Shortly after their arrival, Good's mother died.  Good retired from competitive figure skating at the end of the 2010-11 season, having sustained a serious injury that required surgery.

Programs 
(with Sorensen)

Competitive highlights

With Sorensen

With Deslauriers

References

External links 

 

1990 births
Living people
Figure skaters from Toronto
Danish ice dancers
Canadian female ice dancers
Danish female dancers